Cosmas K. Zachos (born 1951) is a theoretical physicist. He was educated in physics (undergraduate A.B. 1974) at Princeton University, and did graduate work in theoretical physics at the California Institute of Technology (Ph.D. 1979 ) under the supervision of John Henry Schwarz.

Zachos is an emeritus staff member in the theory group of the High Energy Physics Division of Argonne National Laboratory.  He is considered an authority on the subject of phase-space quantization.  His early research involved, jointly, the introduction of renormalization geometrostasis, and the so-called FFZ Lie algebra of noncommutative geometry. His thesis work revealed a balancing repulsive gravitational force present in extended supergravity.

He is co-author of treatises on quantum mechanics in phase space,
a Fellow of the American Physical Society, and a Fellow of the Institute of Physics.

He is Adjunct Professor of physics at the University of Miami and the brother of theoretical computer scientist Stathis Zachos. He is married to biostatistician Sue Leurgans.

References

External links

Zachos's  website at Argonne

 ORCID profile

1951 births
20th-century Greek physicists
21st-century American physicists
California Institute of Technology alumni
Living people
Particle physicists
Fellows of the American Physical Society
Theoretical physicists
Princeton University alumni
Fellows of the Institute of Physics
Mathematical physicists
Date of birth missing (living people)
University of Miami faculty
Argonne National Laboratory people